Farhad Moshiri (born 1963 in Shiraz) is an Iranian artist currently based in Tehran. His art work is rooted in Pop art dialect with a subtle, subversive socio-political commentary.

Biography 
Moshiri studied fine arts at California Institute of the Arts in Valencia, California, in the 1980s, where he first started experimenting with installations, video art and painting. He received his MFA from California Institute of the Arts in 1984, before moving back to Tehran in 1991. He subsequently became well known for his ironic interpretations of hybrids between traditional Iranian forms and those of the consumerist and globalized popular culture widespread in his country.

In the early 2000s, Moshiri was most readily associated with his paintings of jars, which are decorated with traditional Iranian sayings and poetic verse, written in Persian calligraphy. These monumental containers have been described as receptacles of life, memory and desire, and reflect his fascination with archaeology.

His painted jars, which form a trademark of his production, look like three-dimensional objects, bursting with popular foods, drinks and desserts, with popular scripts elegantly written on their body. Other significant works include Stereo Surround Sofa (2004), Silver Portrait on Red (2004), Diamond Brain (2004-5) and A Dream in Tehran (2007).

Moshiri is also interested in the repetition of numbers and letters in scripts for their intrinsic beauty as opposed to any literal meaning or sense they might hold

In Kennedy’s Salt and Pepper Shaker, from 2005, he presents the instantly recognizable Kennedy couple in the form of salt and pepper shakers.

His work is held in several public collections, including the Virginia Museum of Fine Arts, Richmond, the Farjam Collection, Dubai, and the British Museum, London.

He is represented by The Third Line gallery in Dubai, Galerie Emmanuel Perrotin in Paris, New York, Tokyo and Hong Kong, Rodolphe Janssen in Brussels, and Thaddeus Ropac in Salzburg and London.

Bibliography
 Dina Nasser-Khadivi, Maryam Ekhtiar, Farhard Moshiri, Skira, Milan, 2016. .
 Michele Robecchi, Farhad Moshiri, Perrotin Editions, Paris, 2012. 
 Oliver Wick and Jérôme Sans, Farhad Moshiri, The Third Line, Janssen, Perrotin Editions and Ropac, 2010.

References

See also
 Baghdad School
 Islamic art
 Iranian art
 Islamic calligraphy
 List of Iranian artists
 Modern and contemporary art in Iran

Iranian contemporary artists
People from Shiraz
1963 births
Living people
California Institute of the Arts alumni
Pop artists